Eija-Riitta Korhola (née Nieminen; born 15 June 1959 in Lahti) is a Finnish politician and former Member of the European Parliament (MEP). She served three terms, first with the Finnish Christian Democrats between 1999–2003 and then with the National Coalition Party from 2004 to 2014, being part of the European People's Party the whole time. During her MEP years, Korhola served on the Committee on the Environment, Public Health and Food Safety. She was also a member of the ACP–EU Joint Parliamentary Assembly, and acted as a deputy both in the Committee on Budgetary Control and in the Committee on Foreign Affairs.

Education
Korhola has studied in and graduated from the University of Helsinki with the following degrees:
 1990: Bachelor of Arts in philosophy
 1994: Licentiate in philosophy
 2014: Doctorate in environmental science

Career
 1993–1996: Development educator, Finn Church Aid
 1994–1998: Assistant, radio editorial office
 1996–1999: Journalist and educator on the radio and television and in the press
 1997: Publicist (Helsinki Festival)
 1999–2014: Member of the European Parliament
 2003: Party secretary of the Finnish Christian Democrats
 2006–2010: Vice chairwoman of the Finnish National Coalition Party
 Since 2002: Chairwoman of the First Step Forum (human rights organization)

References

External links
 
 
 

|-

|-

1959 births
Living people
People from Lahti
MEPs for Finland 1999–2004
MEPs for Finland 2004–2009
National Coalition Party MEPs
MEPs for Finland 2009–2014
20th-century women MEPs for Finland
21st-century women MEPs for Finland
Christian Democrats (Finland) MEPs